Jack Medd Murphy (September 6, 1925 – May 3, 1984) was an American lawyer and politician who served as the 32nd lieutenant governor of Idaho from 1967 to 1975.

Early life and education  
Murphy was born in Shoshone, Idaho. He attended the University of Utah.

Career 
Murphy served in the United States Army during World War II as a sergeant.

In the 1950s, Murphy became a lawyer in Lincoln County, Idaho. In 1952, Murphy's political career began when he was elected to the Idaho Senate. He served until 1966.

On November 8, 1966, Murphy won the election and became a Republican lieutenant governor of Idaho. Murphy defeated William E. Drevlow with 52.21% of the votes. In 1967, Murphy served during the administration of Republican Governor Don Samuelson.

On November 3, 1970, as an incumbent, Murphy won the election and continued serving as the lieutenant governor of Idaho. Murphy defeated Paul S. Boyd and Wallace Hitt with 56.73% of the votes. Governor Samuelson was defeated by Democrat Cecil Andrus.

Murphy was the Republican nominee for governor in 1974, but was soundly defeated by Andrus. Murphy also served as a member of the board of regents of the Idaho State Department of Education.

Personal life 
Murphy and his family lived in Shoshone, Idaho. Murphy has four children. On May 3, 1984, Murphy died from heart failure in Shoshone, Idaho. Murphy is interred at Shoshone Cemetery.

References

External links

 Jack M. Murphy in Sawtooth National Recreation Area: Hearings Before the Subcommittee on ... By United States. Congress. House. Interior and Insular Affairs

Lieutenant Governors of Idaho
Idaho Republicans
University of Utah alumni
1925 births
1984 deaths
People from Shoshone, Idaho
20th-century American politicians